Morrish Alexander "Tim" Besley  (born 14 March 1927) is an Australian engineer, businessman and former senior public servant. He was Chairman of the Commonwealth Bank between 1988 and 1999, and oversaw the company's privatisation.

Life and career
In 1950, Besley migrated to Australia from New Zealand for work as a Civil Engineer on the Snowy Mountains Scheme.

Besley joined the Commonwealth Public Service in 1967, soon moving into the Department of External Territories. Between 1973 and 1976 he was employed in the Treasury Department, before being appointed to head the Department of Business and Consumer Affairs in 1976. During his Secretary appointment he commenced a law degree at Macquarie University.

Between 1988 and 1999, Besley was Chairman of the Commonwealth Bank board, overseeing the privatisation of the bank. From 1990 to 2001 he was Chairman of Leighton Holdings. Besley served as the Chancellor of Macquarie University between 1994 and 2001.

In 2000, Besley was appointed the Chairman of an Independent Inquiry into Telecommunications Services. The inquiry found services generally satisfactory, but identified that progress needed to be made in rural and remote areas before privatisation of Telstra could be considered.

Awards
Besley was awarded a Centenary Medal in 2001 for service to Australian society in civil engineering and corporate governance. He was appointed a Companion of the Order of Australia in January 2002 for service to the community through the promotion of economic and social development, the advancement of science, innovation and education, and for distinction at the forefront of government and corporate responsibilities.

References

Living people
1927 births
Place of birth missing (living people)
New Zealand emigrants to Australia
Australian public servants
Companions of the Order of Australia
Recipients of the Centenary Medal
University of Auckland alumni
Macquarie University alumni
People from New Plymouth
20th-century Australian businesspeople
20th-century Australian engineers
Fellows of the Australian Academy of Technological Sciences and Engineering
Chancellors of Macquarie University
Commonwealth Bank people